A cause célèbre (pl. causes célèbres, pronounced like the singular) is an issue or incident arousing widespread controversy, outside campaigning, and heated public debate. The term continues in the media in all senses. It is sometimes used positively for celebrated legal cases for their precedent value (each locus classicus or "case-in-point") and more often negatively for infamous ones, whether for scale, outrage, scandal, or conspiracy theories. The term is a French phrase in common usage in English. Since it has been fully adopted into English and is included unitalicized in English dictionaries, it is not normally italicized despite its French origin.

In French,  means a legal case, and  means "famous". The phrase originated with the 37-volume , published in 1763, which was a collection of reports of well-known French court decisions from the 17th and 18th centuries.

While English speakers had used the phrase for many years, it came into much more common usage after the 1894 conviction of Alfred Dreyfus for espionage during the cementing of a period of deep cultural ties with a political tie between England and France, the Entente Cordiale. Both attracted worldwide interest and the period of closeness or rapprochement officially broadened the English language.

It has been noted that the public attention given to a particular case or event can obscure the facts rather than clarify them. As one observer states, "The true story of many a cause célèbre is never made manifest in the evidence given or in the advocates' orations, but might be recovered from these old papers when the dust of ages has rendered them immune from scandal".

Examples

See also 
 Lists of landmark court decisions
 List of French expressions in English
 Media circus
 Missing white woman syndrome

References

External links 

1760s neologisms
Public opinion
Social influence
Legal terminology